Long Way Down was a 2007 motorcycle journey undertaken by Ewan McGregor and Charley Boorman, and the title of the accompanying television series, book and DVD.

Long Way Down may also refer to:

"Long Way Down" (Goo Goo Dolls song), 1995
"Long Way Down" (Keyshia Cole song), 2010
"Long Way Down" (Kiss song), 2012
"Long Way Down" (Robert DeLong song), 2014
Long Way Down (Tom Odell album), 2013
Long Way Down (G. Love & Special Sauce album), 2009
"Long Way Down (Look What the Cat Drug In)", a Michael Penn song from the 1992 album Free-for-All
"Long Way Down", a Gotthard song from the 2003 album Human Zoo
"Long Way Down", a One Direction song from the 2015 album Made in the A.M.
"Long Way Down", a Sara Evans song from the 2017 album Words
Long Way Down (book), a 2017 book by Jason Reynolds

See also
A Long Way Down, a 2005 novel by Nick Hornby
A Long Way Down (film), a 2014 film by Pascal Chaumeil based on Nick Hornby's novel